Calla Curman, née Lundström (1850–1935), was a Swedish writer, salon-holder and feminist. She was also the founder of Stångehuvud nature reserve and one of the five founders of the women's association Nya Idun.

Family 
Calla Curman was born on 12 November 1850 in Jönköping, Sweden, the only child of wealthy industrialist  and his wife Sofie Malmberg (1830–1897). She received in-home tutoring from a private tutor.

A few years after she was widowed by Liljenroth, Calla's parents took her on a trip to Italy. The educated Carl Curman, whom she had met on a visit with her mother to Lysekil during a few summer weeks in 1864, was invited to join them as a guide for the Italian trip. In 1877 she returned to Lysekil, then as Professor Carl Curman's guest. The following year they were married. He had worked as a spa doctor in Lysekil since 1859. With Curman, she had children , Ingrid Fries, Nanna Fries and Carl G. Curman.

Activity 
Curman was the initiator of the founding of the Nya Idun women's society in 1885; it was founded together with Ellen Fries, Hanna Winge, Ellen Key, and Amelie Wikström. Nya Idun was modelled on its male counterpart, Sällskapet Idun. In her justification for founding Nya Idun, Curman wrote: "Why should not we women too, regardless of our different political and religious views, be able to come together for a mutual exchange of ideas in common intellectual, artistic and literary interests?"

Curman was also involved in a number of other issues. She became honorary president of the latter association in 1928. She was also an accomplished pianist, publishing her own booklet of compositions in 1897 and was one of those calling for the establishment of Mother's Day in 1919. She was awarded the Illis quorum and the Friends of Handicraft Medal.

The Curman receptions 
She wanted to bring together many different kinds of people for fruitful conversations and discussions. As a rule, two evenings were organised in the autumn and three in the winter for the salon. The social aspect was considered the most important; food offerings were light. The Curman receptions featured people such as poet Carl Snoilsky, artist August Malmström, mathematician Sofya Kovalevskaya, composer Laura Netzel, writer Viktor Rydberg, Bjørnstjerne Bjørnson and social debater Ellen Key.

The Curman villas and the Stångehuvud nature reserve 

They returned to Lysekil every summer and Calla took long walks in the countryside, becoming particularly fond of Stångehuvud a short distance outside the town, where the granite cliffs were sculpted by ice. By the early 1870s, quarrying had begun in Stångehuvud, which was hard on the Bohuslän cliffs at the time, with no regard for the area's unique nature. During summer after summer in the last decades of the 19th and early 20th centuries, Curman saw the area increasingly nibbled away at. The advance of the stone industry in Stångehuvud troubled her to her core. She would spend many evenings wondering what could be done to stop the quarrying and spare the mountains from further destruction.

But this was easier said than done, since the stone industry provided many jobs and a large income for the stone industry. Curman wrote several letters to the newspapers and to the leaders of Lysekil, asking firstly that stone mining should be stopped, but if it had to continue, it should be done more systematically and with greater care. However, her views were not heard. In order to prevent the destruction of the beautiful scenery at Stångehuvud, from 1916, with great persistence and lengthy negotiations with the landowners, she gradually began to buy up piece after piece of land, often through agents so as not to reveal that it was the same person who was the buyer. On 3 November 1925, she donated the area to the Royal Swedish Academy of Sciences with the intention of preserving it for all time. At the same time, the Carl and Calla Curman Foundation was set up to keep a watchful eye on Stångehuvud and to determine what care and maintenance measures should be taken to preserve and nurture the area. A memorial stone to Calla Curman's work is erected on Stångehuvud with the caption  'Stångehuvud's savior'.

Through donations, she also made a major lasting contribution to Stockholm. Like her mother Sofie, she also devoted herself to charitable work for individuals.

Death 
Curman died on 2 February 1935 in Stockholm and is buried at Norra begravningsplatsen.

Works

References

Further reading

External links 

1850 births
1935 deaths
Swedish salon-holders
Swedish feminists
Swedish socialites
19th-century Swedish writers
Members of Nya Idun
Burials at Norra begravningsplatsen
Recipients of the Illis quorum